The 16th Producers Guild of America Awards (also known as 2005 Producers Guild Awards), honoring the best film and television producers of 2004, were held on January 22, 2005. The ceremony at Culver Studios in Los Angeles, California was hosted by Wayne Brady. The nominees were announced on January 5, 2005.

Winners and nominees

Film
{| class=wikitable style="width="100%"
|-
! colspan="2" style="background:#abcdef;"| Darryl F. Zanuck Award for Outstanding Producer of Theatrical Motion Pictures
|-
| colspan="2" style="vertical-align:top;"|
 The Aviator – Michael Mann and Graham King Finding Neverland – Richard N. Gladstein and Nellie Bellflower
 The Incredibles – John Walker
 Million Dollar Baby – Clint Eastwood, Albert S. Ruddy, and Tom Rosenberg
 Sideways – Michael London
|}

Television

David O. Selznick Achievement Award in Theatrical Motion PicturesLaura ZiskinDavid Susskind Achievement Award in TelevisionJohn WellsMilestone AwardJeffrey KatzenbergStanley Kramer AwardHotel Rwanda
Voces inocentes (Innocent Voices)

Vanguard Award
Terry Semel

Visionary Award
Rescue Me

References

 2004
2004 film awards
2004 guild awards
2004 television awards